Huehue Quetzalmacatzin was a tlatoani (ruler) of Amaquemecan in 15th-century Mesoamerica.

Family
He was the son of Ipantlaqualloctzin.

His wife was Tlacocihuatzin Ilama. Their daughter was Maquiztzin, wife of Tlacaelel and mother of Cacamatzin.

His family is mentioned by annalist Chimalpahin.

References

Tlatoque
15th-century monarchs in North America
15th-century indigenous people of the Americas